Within each country GDP is normally measured by a national government statistical agency, as private sector organizations normally do not have access to the information required (especially information on expenditure and production by governments).

 Algeria : Office of National Statistics (Algeria)
 Argentina: Instituto Nacional de Estadística y Censos (INDEC)
 Albania: Institute of Statistics (Instituti nderkombetare i statistikave). 
 Andorra: Departament d' Estadística del Principat d' Andorra 
 Armenia: Statistical Committee of Armenia. 
 Australia: Australian Bureau of Statistics (ABS), Reserve Bank of Australia (RBA).
 Austria: Statistik Austria.
 Bangladesh: Bangladesh Bureau of Statistics.
 Benin: Institut National de la Statistique Benin (INSAE)
 Belgium: Statistics Belgium.
 Bosnia and Herzegovina: Federal Office of Statistics (FBIH)  and Institute of Statistics (RS) 
 Botswana: Statistics Botswana
 Brazil: Instituto Brasileiro de Geografia e Estatística (IBGE).
 Bulgaria: National Statistical Institute (NSI; Национален статистически институт).
 Cameroon: National Institute of Statistics (INS)
 Chile: Banco Central de Chile
 China, People's Republic of: National Bureau of Statistics of China (中华人民共和国国家统计局).
 China, Republic of: Directorate-General of Budget, Accounting and Statistics (行政院主計處).
 Colombia: Departamento Administrativo Nacional de Estadistica (DANE). 
 Costa Rica: Banco Central de Costa Rica (BCCR).
 Croatia: Croatian Bureau of Statistics (CROSTAT).
 Canada: Statistics Canada (StatCan).
 Cyprus: Statistical Service (Στατιστική Υπηρεσία της Κυπριακής Δημοκρατίας; CYSTAT). 
 Czech Republic: Czech Statistical Office (Český statistický úřad, ČSÚ).
 Denmark: Danmarks Statistik.
 Dominican Republic: Central Bank of the Dominican Republic
 Egypt: CAPMAS
 Eritriea: National Statistics Office
 Estonia: Statistikaamet
 Ethiopia: Central Statistical Agency (CSA)
 European Union: Eurostat
 Finland: Tilastokeskus
 France: Institut National de la Statistique et des Etudes Economiques (INSEE)
 Germany: Statistisches Bundesamt
 Greece: Hellenic Statistical Authority - ELSTAT (Ελληνική Στατιστική Αρχή, ΕΛΣΤΑΤ)
 Hong Kong: Census and Statistics Department (政府統計處)
 Hungary: Hungarian Central Statistical Office
 Iceland: Statistics Iceland
 India: Ministry of Statistics and Programme Implementation
 Indonesia: Badan Pusat Statistik (BPS)
 Isle of Man: Isle of Man Government Economic Affairs 
 Ireland, Republic of: Central Statistics Office Ireland (Príomhoifig Staidrimh na hÉireann)
 Israel: Israel Central Bureau of Statistics
 Italy: Istituto Nazionale di Statistica (ISTAT)
 Lesotho: Bureau of Statistics
 Japan: Cabinet Office (CO, 内閣府)
 Jamaica: Statistical Institute of Jamaica (STATIN)
 Korea (South): Bank of Korea (BOK, 한국은행)  
 Kosovo: Enti i Statistikës së Kosovës (ESK) 
 Kuwait: [الادارة المركزية للإحصاء] (ESK) Kuwait Central Statistical Bureau https://www.csb.gov.kw
 Latvia: Centrālā statistikas pārvalde 
 Lithuania: Lietuvos Statistikos Departamentas (Department of Statistics, Lithuania) 
 Luxembourg: Service central de la statistique et des études économiques (Luxembourg Statistics) 
 Macedonia, Republic of: Zavod za Statistika na Makedonija 
 Malaysia: Jabatan Perangkaan Malaysia (Department of Statistics, Malaysia) 
 Macau: Direcção dos Serviços de Estatística e Censos (DSEC) 
 Mexico: Instituto Nacional de Estadística, Geografía e Informática (INEGI)
 Moldova: Biroul Naţional de Statistică (BNS)] 
 The Netherlands: Centraal Bureau voor de Statistiek (Statistics Netherlands)
 New Zealand: Statistics New Zealand (Tatauranga Aotearoa)
 Nigeria: National Bureau of Statistics 
 Norway: Statistisk Sentralbyrå
 Pakistan: Federal Bureau of Statistics 
 Palestinian National Authority: Palestinian Central Bureau of Statistics (PCBS)
 Peru: Instituto Nacional de Estadística e Informática (INEI)
 Philippines: Philippine National Statistical Coordination Board  
 Poland: Central Statistical Office (Główny Urząd Statystyczny; GUS)
 Portugal: Instituto Nacional de Estatística (National Statistics Office)
 Qatar: Qatar Statistics Authority; General Secretariat for Development Planning 
 Romania: Institutul National de Statistica
 Russia: Federal Service of State Statistics (Rosstat)
 Saudi Arabia: Central Department of Statistics (وزارة الاقتصاد والتخطيط) 
 Serbia: Statistical Office of the Republic of Serbia  
 Singapore: Singapore Department of Statistics 
 Slovakia: Štatistický úrad SR 
 Slovenia: Statistični urad Republike Slovenije (SURS)
 South Africa: Statistics South Africa (STATSSA)
 Spain: Instituto Nacional de Estadística (INE)
 Sweden: Statistics Sweden (SCB)
 Switzerland: Swiss Statistics - Federal Statistical Office
 Thailand The National Economic and Social Development Board (NESDB)
 Turkey: Türkiye İstatistik Kurumu (TUIK)
 Ukraine: State Statistics Committee of Ukraine (Derzhkomstat; SSC)
 United Kingdom: UK Statistics Authority, Office for National Statistics
 United States: Bureau of Economic Analysis (BEA)
 Uruguay: Instituto Nacional de Estadística (INE) 
 Venezuela: Instituto Nacional de Estadística (INE) 
 Vietnam: General Statistics Office (GSO, Tổng cục Thống kê)

See also 
 United Nations System of National Accounts
 List of national and international statistical services

 
Gross domestic product